Hemiglaea is a genus of moths of the family Noctuidae.

Species
 Hemiglaea costalis (Butler, 1879)

References
Natural History Museum Lepidoptera genus database
Hemiglaea at funet

Cuculliinae